Love You To Death is a 2012 Hindi-language comedy film directed by Rafeeq Ellias, featuring Yuki Ellias,  Chandan Roy Sanyal, Sheeba Chaddha in the lead roles. The film's music was composed by Ronit Chaterji.
The film was released on 3 February 2012.

Cast
 Yuki Ellias
 Chandan Roy Sanyal
 Sheeba Chaddha
 Suhasini Mulay
 Kallol Banerjee
 Sohrab Ardeshir
 Chetan Sashital
 Carl Sequeira
 Leonid Kudryavtsev
 Nicholas Brown

Critical reception
The film received mixed reviews from critics. Avijit Ghosh from Times of India gave it 2.5/5 stating that "LYTD is loaded with sly, witty dialogues that might have sounded great in conversations and on paper but doesn't translate into laughter on celluloid.The movie's last 20 minutes are its best. Using a live art installation as the setting for the climax and where dozens of revolvers - but only one has bullets -- circulate among the guests, makes for engrossing suspense."

References

2012 films
2010s Hindi-language films
2012 masala films
2012 comedy films
Films set in Mumbai